Elandslaagte is farming and coal-mining centre some 26 km north-east of Ladysmith. Afrikaans for 'elands flat', it was the scene of the Battle of Elandslaagte, one of the first battles of the Second Anglo-Boer War, on 21 October 1899. Monuments have been erected to the fallen on both sides, including the Dutch Corps Monument. The Dutch Corps Monument was destroyed in 2014.

References

Populated places in the Alfred Duma Local Municipality
Mining communities in South Africa